The Reno Open was a golf tournament on the Ben Hogan Tour that was contested from 1990 to 1991 and played at Northgate Golf Course in Reno, Nevada. 

Mike Springer won the inaugural tournament.

John Flannery captured the 1991 edition of the event. He defeated Rob Boldt, Esteban Toledo and Tom Lehman in a sudden-death playoff to earn $20,000 and his first victory on the circuit. The playoff is recognized as one of the most unusual in Tour history. On the second hole, the 18th, Flannery appeared to have won before failing to mark his ball properly on the green, a two-stroke rules violation. Toledo also committed a rules violation on the green and was accessed a one-stroke penalty. Each player carded a six, forcing the playoff into the third-extra hole, where Flannery won the event.

Winners

References

Former Korn Ferry Tour events
Golf in Nevada
Sports in Reno, Nevada
Recurring sporting events established in 1990
Recurring sporting events disestablished in 1991
1990 establishments in Nevada
1991 disestablishments in Nevada